Gibraltar (also Gibralter) is an unincorporated community in Skagit County, Washington, United States. It lies on the west shore of Similk Bay.

Notes

Unincorporated communities in Skagit County, Washington
Unincorporated communities in Washington (state)
Populated coastal places in Washington (state)